Keely Shаye Smith (born September 25, 1963), also known as Keely Shaye Brosnan, is an American journalist, author, television host, actress, producer, and director.

Career
Smith appeared with Huey Lewis in the MTV music video "Stuck with You" which spent three weeks at number one spot on the Billboard Hot 100 list from September 20 to October 10, 1986. Smith appeared as Valerie Freeman for one season on General Нospital (1990).

She was an environmental correspondent for six years for ABC's The Home Show, which earned her two Genesis Аwards, a Special Achievement Award at the 1991 Environmental Film Festival, and a nomination from the Environmental Media Association (EMA). Women in Film, the Natural Resources Defense Council, EMA, Earth Communications Office, Heal the Bay, Oceana, Senator Barbara Boxer, Malibu Times, and Organic Style Magazine have all honored Smith for her ongoing commitment to the environment.

Smith served as a correspondent for NBC's primetime hit show Unsolved Mysteries from 1995 to 1997 in the show's "phone center", providing information on updated stories as well as for "special bulletin" segments.

She served as a gardening expert and correspondent for ABC's Good Morning America and Mike and Maty, as well as an entertainment correspondent for NBC's Today Show, CBS's Entertainment Tonight, and HBO's World Entertainment Report.  Additionally, she hosted Great Bears, a series for the Outdoor Life Network.

As a TV producer, Smith-Brosnan created and hosted an eco-friendly home and garden how-to show called Home Green Home for PBS.

Smith has had six articles published in Los Angeles Confidential magazine.

Smith made her directorial debut and produced the documentary film Poisoning Paradise (2017); the film delves into the seemingly idyllic world of Native Hawaiians, whose communities are surrounded by experimental test sites for genetically engineered seed corn and pesticides.

Activism
From 1995 to 2000, Smith and her future husband worked with the Natural Resources Defense Council and the International Fund for Animal Welfare to stop a proposed salt factory from being built at Laguna San Ignacio, Baja California Sur, Mexico. The couple is committed to environmental education in the classroom for grades K-12 and currently sponsor long-time friend Jane Goodall's Roots and Shoots youth and humanitarian program. 

In Spring 2007, the couple also successfully fought the Cabrillo Port Liquefied Natural Gas facility that was proposed off the coast of Oxnard and Malibu; the State Lands Commission eventually denied the lease to build the terminal. In May 2007, the Brosnans donated $100,000 to help replace a playground on the Hawaiian island of Kauai. In 2009, the Brosnans visited the White House to help Congressman William Delahunt and Congressman Eni Faleomavaega introduce legislation to close loopholes on commercial and scientific whaling worldwide. In May 2009, the Brosnans both testified in Washington, D.C., before the Environmental Protection Agency in support of the new Climate Change Bill (known as the American Clean Energy and Security Act).. 

Smith directed and produced the award winning documentary film Poisoning Paradise about the toxic agricultural environment of Kauai.

Personal life

Smith met actor Pierce Brosnan on a beach in Mexico on April 8, 1994. They married at Ballintubber Abbey in County Mayo, Ireland, on August 4, 2001. They have two sons, Dylan Thomas Brosnan (b. January 1997) and Paris Beckett Brosnan (b. February 2001).

References

External links 

1963 births
Living people
American television reporters and correspondents
Writers from California
Journalists from California
Writers from Vallejo, California
Actors from Vallejo, California
American women television journalists
21st-century American women